Anisul Hoque (born 4 March 1965) is a Bangladeshi author, screenwriter, novelist, dramatist and journalist. He won Bangla Academy Literary Award in 2011. His most popular work is his non-fiction novel Maa (mother). He is also the editor of Kishore Alo. In addition, he is one of the two writers of the film Television (2012 film).

Early life and education
Hoque was born in Nilphamari in 1965 to Mofazzal Hoque and Mst Anwara Begum. He was the student of Rangpur PTI primary school. He passed SSC exam from Rangpur Zilla School in 1981 and HSC exam from Rangpur Carmichael College in 1983. He graduated from Bangladesh University of Engineering and Technology (BUET), trained as a civil engineer.

Career
Hoque's inspiration in journalism and writing started during his student life. After his graduation, he joined to serve as a government employee but resigned only after 15 days. Instead, he started working as a journalist. He attended the International Writing Program at the University of Iowa in 2010. Currently, Hoque is working as an associate editor of a Bengali-language daily Prothom Alo and the editor of monthly youth magazine Kishor Alo.

Personal life
Hoque is married to Marina Yasmin. They have a daughter, Padya Paramita.

Literary works

Poetry
 Khola Chithi Sundarer Kachhe
 Ami Achhi Amar Anale
 Jalrang Padya
 Asale Ayur Cheye Baro Shaadh Tar Akash Dekhar
 Tomake Bhabna Kori
 Tomake Na Paoar Kabita (2013) by Prothoma

Novels
 Ondhokarer Eksho Bochhor (1995)
 Kheya (The Ferryboat) (1996)
 Fand (Trap) (1997)
 Bristibondhu (The Rain Friend) (1997)
 Amar Ekta Dukhkho Achhe  (I have a Sorrow) (1999)
 Se (The Person) (2002)
 Maa (Mother) (2003)
 Abar Tora Kipte Ho 
 Dushwapner Jatri (2006) 
 Khuda o Bhalobashar Galpo
 Nandini (2006) 
 Alo Andhokare Jai (2007)
 Dhukhpari Shukhpari (Fairy of Sadness Fairy of Happiness)
 Trap (translated from Bengali to English by Inam Ahmed, published by Indian Age)
 Ayeshamangal (translated into English as The Ballad of Ayesha)

Television drama

 Ekannoborti
 Choruibhati
 Naal Piran (Red Shirt)
 Korimon Bewa
 Ghure Daranor Swapno
 69
 No Man's Land
 Nikhoj Shongbad
 Radio Chocolate 69.0 FM

Film script writer
 Bachelor, 2004 
 Made in Bangladesh (directed by Mostofa Sarwar Farooki)
 Third Person Singular Number
 Swapnodanay (On the Wings of Dreams) (2007)
 Television (film) (2013) with director Mostofa Sarwar Farooki

Awards
 Bangla Academy Literary Award (2011) 
 CitiBank Ananda Alo Award for Best Novel (2009)
 Khalekdad Chowdhury Literature Award 1415
 Television, a film script jointly written by Mostofa Sarwar Farooki and Anisul Hoque, has received Asian Cinema Fund (script development), provided by South Korea's Pusan Film Festival
 Euro Shishu Shahitya Award (2006)
 BACHSAS Award for Best Screenplay
 TENASINAS Award for Best Screenplay

References

1965 births
Living people
People from Rangpur District
Bangladesh University of Engineering and Technology alumni
Recipients of Bangla Academy Award
Bengali-language writers
Bengali novelists
Bangladeshi male novelists
International Writing Program alumni
Bangladeshi screenwriters
Carmichael College alumni